Take Me to Your Leader is the second studio album by British-American MC/producer MF DOOM, released under the alias King Geedorah via Big Dada on June 17, 2003. King Geedorah is the alias MF DOOM used as part of the underground super group Monsta Island Czars. The album features guest appearances from MF Grimm (as Jet-Jaguar) as well as other MIC members. The character is based on the three-headed King Ghidorah, a fictional monster who appears as Godzilla's enemy in the Godzilla films.

Reception

Mark Martelli of Pitchfork wrote that Take Me to Your Leader "will excite you in a way most hip-hop projects just aren't able: It's not straining for credibility nor putting effort into being revelatory; it just is." Noel Dix of Exclaim! remarked that the album "plays like a cinematic space adventure that you never want to end".

In 2009, Rhapsody ranked Take Me to Your Leader 17th on its list "Hip-Hop's Best Albums of the Decade". In 2012, Stereogum named it the third best MF DOOM album. In 2014, it was listed by Complex as one of the "Best One-Producer Albums of the 2000s". Retrospectively, Jacob Adams of Spectrum Culture wrote, "It's perhaps one of the weirdest rap albums of the past decade, yet one of the most endlessly fascinating. It deserves a second listen."

Track listing

Personnel
Credits are adapted from the album's liner notes.
 Metal Fingered Villain – production
 King Geedorah – mixing, mastering
 E.Mason – co-production

Charts

References

External links
 

2003 albums
Big Dada albums